RaTavious Anton "Taye" Biddle (born February 27, 1983) is an American football wide receiver.  He was previously with the Sacramento Mountain Lions of the United Football League. He was signed by the Carolina Panthers as an undrafted free agent in 2006. He played college football at Mississippi.

Biddle was also a member of the Tampa Bay Buccaneers, Detroit Lions, New York Giants, Florida Tuskers, Minnesota Vikings, Edmonton Eskimos and Pittsburgh Power. He is also currently in a Florida prison for kidnapping.

Professional career

Carolina Panthers
He was signed as an undrafted free agent out of Ole Miss by the Carolina Panthers and played with them through the 2007 pre-season before being released in the final roster cuts. Biddle attracted national attention after catching 2 passes for 108 yards and 2 touchdowns in a pre-season game against the New York Giants on August 11, 2007.

Detroit Lions
On July 29, 2008, Biddle was signed by the Detroit Lions. On August 18, he was waived/injured by the team and subsequently placed on injured reserve. He was later released with an injury settlement.

New York Giants
On September 8, 2008, Biddle was signed to the practice squad of the New York Giants. The team released wide receiver Marcus Monk from the practice squad to make room for Biddle. On September 24, Biddle was promoted to the active roster after wide receiver Plaxico Burress was suspended for one game. The Giants released waived Biddle on October 8 and re-signed him to the practice squad the following day.

Following the 2008 season, Biddle was re-signed to a future contract on January 12, 2009. He was waived on August 31.

Florida Tuskers
Biddle played for the Florida Tuskers of the United Football League in 2009, catching 30 passes for 525 yards and two touchdowns.

Minnesota Vikings
Biddle worked out for the Minnesota Vikings on December 1, 2009. He was signed to a future contract on January 22, 2010. Biddle was waived as part of final cuts before the beginning of the 2010 season.

Sacramento Mountain Lions
Biddle played for the Mountain Lions of the United Football League for the 2010 season, recording 23 receptions for 310 yards and 1 touchdown.

Edmonton Eskimos
On March 3, 2011 Biddle signed with the Eskimos.

Pittsburgh Power
On February 27, 2012, Biddle signed with the Power. He was released by the Power on March 1, 2012.

Personal life
Biddle was shot two times, once in the leg and the other in his hand in his hometown of Decatur, Alabama on January 18, 2009 while in his vehicle outside of his mothers apartment building. His injuries were non-life-threatening.

References

External links
Just Sports Stats
United Football League bio

1983 births
Living people
Sportspeople from Decatur, Alabama
Players of American football from Alabama
American football wide receivers
Ole Miss Rebels football players
Carolina Panthers players
Tampa Bay Buccaneers players
Detroit Lions players
New York Giants players
Florida Tuskers players
Minnesota Vikings players
Sacramento Mountain Lions players
Edmonton Elks players